is a Shinto shrine located in the city of Wakayama Wakayama Prefecture, Japan. It enshrines the deified first Shōgun of the Tokugawa shogunate, Tokugawa Ieyasu. It is also known as the

History
The Kishū Tōshō-gū was established by Tokugawa Yorinobu, the tenth son of Tokugawa Ieyasu,  in 1621 as the general guardian of the Nankaidō region. It was modeled in the Azuchi–Momoyama style as the Nikkō Tōshō-gū, and had sculptures by Hidari Jingorō and fusuma paintings by Kanō Tan'yū. Black lacquer and red lacquer were applied both inside and outside, and the structures and sculptures were brilliantly colored and plated with metal fittings. The shrine is situated on Mount Saiga, which is located on a cove of Wakaura Bay, with a sand spit resembling the Ama-no-hashidate on the right. Construction on the shrine was begun in 1619, in preparation for Tokugawa Yorinobu officially entering Kii Province and becoming daimyō of Kishū Domain. Prior to the Meiji restoration, the shrine also had a Three-story pagoda and a Yakushi-do chapel, but these were removed per he Shinbutsu bunri decrees of the new Meiji government. The shrine was designated as a prefectural shrine under State Shinto's Modern system of ranked Shinto shrines.

Cultural Properties
Several structures in the Kishū Tōshō-gū are National Important Cultural Properties.  These include the two-story Rōmon gate, the main shrine complex containing the Honden and Haiden, East Corridor, West Corridor, Karamon Gate, East Wall and West Wall

Gallery

See also 
Tōshō-gū
List of Tōshō-gū

References

External links

Wakamatsuri Kishū Tōshō-gū site
Wakayama Cit Tourist Association 
Wakayama Prefectural Tourist Association 

1621 establishments in Japan
Religious buildings and structures completed in 1621
Shinto shrines in Wakayama Prefecture
Tōshō-gū
Wakayama (city)
Kii Province